Uronautes is a dubious genus of extinct plesiosaur from the family Rhomaleosauridae. Uronautes is known from several fossilized vertebra, portions of a few limbs, and ribs.

Etymology
The word Uronautes comes from a fusion of the two Greek words Ουρα, meaning "tailed," and Ναυτεσ, meaning "sailor", or "mariner". The species name of U. cetiformis comes from the Greek word for whale (or any large sea monster), κῆτος and the Latin word forma, which means "shaped", of "formed" meaning "shape".

Taxonomy
Uronautes was first described by the American paleontologist, Edward Drinker Cope in 1876. Because of the small number of supposed Uronautes fossils, Samuel Paul Welles described the genus as a "nomen dubium", doubting that the remains were evidence of a true genus in 1956. The genus Uronautes is still considered a nomen dubium which means "dubious name". In zoological nomenclature, a nomen dubium is a scientific name that is of unknown or doubtful application.

Description
Like many other rhomaleosaurids, such as Rhomaleosaurus, Uronautes was a short-necked plesiosaur. The Cervical vertebrae are short, with partially attached processes and double-headed ribs.

Distribution

Supposed Urounautes fossils are known from only a few locations: the Cretaceous deposits of the Fox Hills, and in similar deposits near Fort Pierre, and the Judith River, all in Montana.

See also

Aptychodon
Picrocleidus
Scanisaurus
 List of plesiosaur genera
 Timeline of plesiosaur research

References

External links
http://www.biolib.cz/en/taxon/id428614/
http://paleodb.org/cgi-bin/bridge.pl?action=checkTaxonInfo&taxon_no=36526
http://www.plesiosaur.com/database/genusIndividual.php?i=117

Nomina dubia
Late Cretaceous plesiosaurs of North America
Taxa named by Edward Drinker Cope